Craig Francis Romero (born September 25, 1954) is a New Iberia corporate salesman who represented District 22 in the Louisiana State Senate from 1993 to 2008.

In 2004, Romero ran for the Third District seat but finished third in the state's unique jungle primary. In the 2004 race, Romero faced the retiring Tauzin's son, Republican Billy Tauzin III and Democrat Charlie Melancon of Napoleonville, the seat of Assumption Parish. Under the jungle primary system, if the leading candidate does not receive over 50 percent of the vote, the top two finishers in a race – regardless of party affiliation – advance to a runoff election, which is held several weeks after the national general election.

Personal history

They have seven children, Nicholas, Hannah, Jacob, Sarah, Bethany, Danielle, and Isaac. Isaac died at age 23 in a single-vehicle car crash on August 25, 2018.

References

External links

https://web.archive.org/web/20061215215115/http://www.vote-smart.org/bio.php?can_id=BS022473
Louisiana State Senate info on Romero

Republican Party Louisiana state senators
Living people
American businesspeople
1954 births
University of Louisiana at Lafayette alumni
People from New Iberia, Louisiana
Louisiana Creole people of Spanish descent
Catholics from Louisiana